

2000s 

South African Music Awards